Evžen Tošenovský (born 26 February 1956) is a Czech politician. He was elected as a Member of the European Parliament (MEP) in the 2009 European Parliament election receiving the largest number of preference votes.

Tošenovský graduated from the VSB – Technical University of Ostrava in 1981. In 1993, he was elected mayor of Ostrava and remained in the office until 2000. From 2000 to 2008, Tošenovský served as governor of Moravian-Silesian Region.

He's married and has two children. Tošenovský is also a recipient of numerous awards and decorations. In 2002, he was promoted to the rank of knight of the Légion d'honneur.

He ran for president in the first direct presidential election. He participated in Civic democratic primaries but lost to Přemysl Sobotka.

References

External links 

 

1956 births
Living people
Chevaliers of the Légion d'honneur
Politicians from Ostrava
Mayors of Ostrava
Civic Democratic Party (Czech Republic) MEPs
MEPs for the Czech Republic 2009–2014
MEPs for the Czech Republic 2014–2019
Candidates in the 2013 Czech presidential election
Civic Democratic Party (Czech Republic) presidential candidates
Civic Democratic Party (Czech Republic) governors
MEPs for the Czech Republic 2019–2024
Technical University of Ostrava alumni